Switzerland held a national pre-selection to choose the two songs that would go to the Eurovision Song Contest 1956. It was held on 28 April 1956.

Before Eurovision

National final 
The final was held on 28 April 1956 in Lausanne, where "Das alte Karussell" and "Refrains" reached the first two places, as the two entries which were sent to the Eurovision Song Contest, both performed by Lys Assia. The points and rankings of the other songs remain unknown.

"" was co-written by Émile Gardaz and Géo Voumard, and "Das alte Karussell" was written in German and composed by Georg Benz Stahl.

At Eurovision 
1956 was the only year the Contest allowed two entries per country. For Eurovision, the "s" in "" was dropped from the title, and the song went on to win the inaugural Eurovision Song Contest. The result of "", as well as the scores and placings of the other songs including the points of "Refrain", weren't declared.

"" performed ninth at the second round with the same order of countries. Both of the Swiss entries were conducted at the contest by the musical director Fernando Paggi. As Lys Assia represented Switzerland singing both songs, she is one of only two performers to do so in one Eurovision edition, alongside Michele Arnaud for Luxembourg this same year with two entries in French. With this, Switzerland as well as Assia, are the only country and performer with two songs in two different languages in Eurovision history.

References

External links
Swiss National Final page
from Diggiloo Thrush Lyrics & info - Das alte Karussell
from Diggiloo Thrush Lyrics & info - Refrain

1956
Countries in the Eurovision Song Contest 1956
Eurovision